The accusative case (abbreviated ) of a noun is the grammatical case used to receive the direct object of a transitive verb.

In the English language, the only words that occur in the accusative case are pronouns: 'me,' 'him,' 'her,' 'us,' 'whom', and ‘them’. For example, the pronoun they, as the subject of a clause, is in the nominative case ("They wrote a book"); but if the pronoun is instead the object of the verb, it is in the accusative case and they becomes them (“Fred greeted them").  For compound direct objects, it would be, e.g., "Fred invited her and me to the party".

The accusative case is used in many languages for the objects of (some or all) prepositions. It is usually combined with the nominative case (for example in Latin).

The English term, "accusative", derives from the Latin , which, in turn, is a translation of the Greek . The word can also mean "causative", and that might have derived from the Greeks, but the sense of the Roman translation has endured and is used in some other modern languages as the grammatical term for this case, for example in Russian.

The accusative case is typical of early Indo-European languages and still exists in some of them (including Albanian, Armenian, Latin, Sanskrit, Greek, German, Polish, Romanian, Russian, Serbian, and Ukrainian), in the Finno-Ugric languages (such as Finnish and Hungarian), in all Turkic languages, in Dravidan languages like Malayalam, and in Semitic languages (such as Arabic). Some Balto-Finnic languages, such as Finnish, have two cases for objects, the accusative and the partitive case. In morphosyntactic alignment terms, both do the accusative function, but the accusative object is telic, while the partitive is not.

Modern English almost entirely lacks declension in its nouns; pronouns, however, have an understood case usage, as in them, her, him and whom, which merges the accusative and dative functions, and originates in old Germanic dative forms (see Declension in English).

Example
In the sentence The man sees the dog, the dog is the direct object of the verb "to see". In English, which has mostly lost grammatical cases, the definite article and noun – "the dog" – remain the same noun form without number agreement in the noun either as subject or object, though an artifact of it is in the verb and has number agreement, which changes to "sees". One can also correctly use "the dog" as the subject of a sentence: "The dog sees the cat."

In a declined language, the morphology of the article or noun changes with gender agreement. This is the form in the nominative case, used for the subject of a sentence. If this article/noun pair is used as the object of a verb, it (usually) changes to the accusative case, which entails an article shift in German –  (The man sees the dog).

Latin 
The accusative case in Latin has minor differences from the accusative case in Proto-Indo-European. 
Nouns in the accusative case can be used:
 as a direct object;
 to qualify duration of time, e.g., "for many years"; ducentos annos, "for 200 years"; this is known as the accusative of duration of time,
 as the subject of an indirect statement with the verb in the subjunctive mood, (e.g. , "He said that I had been cruel"; in later Latin works, such as the Vulgate, such a phrasing is replaced by quod and a regularly ordered sentence, having the subject in the nominative and the verb in the indicative mood, e.g.).
to qualify purpose, e.g., ad proficiscendum, "for the purpose of departing"; ad effēminandōs animōs, "for the purpose of weakening [or, effeminating] the spirit".

For the accusative endings, see Latin declensions.

German 
The accusative case is used for the direct object in a sentence. The masculine forms for German articles, e.g., 'the', 'a/an', 'my', etc., change in the accusative case: they always end in -en. The feminine, neutral and plural forms do not change.

For example,  (dog) is a masculine word, so the article changes when used in the accusative case:
. (lit., I have a dog.) In the sentence "a dog" is in the accusative case as it is the second idea (the object) of the sentence.

Some German pronouns also change in the accusative case.

The accusative case is also used after particular German prepositions. The latter prepositions take the accusative when motion or action is specified (being done into/onto the space), but take the dative when location is specified (being done in/on that space). These prepositions are also used in conjunction with certain verbs, in which case it is the verb in question which governs whether the accusative or dative should be used.

Adjective endings also change in the accusative case. Another factor that determines the endings of adjectives is whether the adjective is being used after a definite article (the), after an indefinite article (a/an) or without any article before the adjective (many green apples).

Russian 
In Russian, accusative is used not only to display the direct object of an action, but also to indicate the destination or goal of motion. It is also used with some prepositions. The prepositions  and  can both take accusative in situations where they are indicating the goal of a motion.

In the masculine, Russian also distinguishes between animate and inanimate nouns with regard to the accusative; only the animates carry a marker in this case.

The PIE accusative case has nearly eroded in Russian, merging with the genitive or the nominative in most declensions. Only singular first-declension nouns (ending in '', '', or '') have a distinct accusative ('', '', or '').

Finnish 
Traditional Finnish grammars say the accusative is the case of a total object, while the case of a partial object is the partitive.

The major new Finnish grammar, breaks with the traditional classification to limit the accusative case to the special case of the personal pronouns and /. The new grammar considers other total objects as being in the nominative or genitive case.

Semitic languages 
Accusative case marking existed in Proto-Semitic, Akkadian, and Ugaritic. It is preserved today in many Semitic languages as Modern Standard Arabic, Hebrew and Ge'ez.

Accusative in Akkadian

Nominative:  (a/the man)
Accusative:  (I trust a/the man)

Accusative in Arabic

Nominative:  (a man)
Accusative:  (I ask a man)  (I ask the man)

The accusative case is called in Arabic  and it has many other uses in addition to marking the object of a verb.

Accusative in Hebrew

Nominative:  (an apple) (kh=ח/خ/כ/Voiceless uvular fricative)
Accusative:  (I ate the apple)

In Hebrew, if the object of the sentence is a pronoun (eg I, you, s/he) and the transitive verb requires a direct object, the word ET is combined with the pronoun into an object pronoun.
the combined words are:
Me = oti/אותי
you (singular) = otkha/אותך (M) or otakh/אותך (F)
him = oto/אותו
her = ota/אותה
we = otanu/אותנו
you (plural) = otkhem/אותכם (M) or otkhen/אותכן (F)
them = otam/אותם (M) or otan/אותן (F)

Japanese 

In Japanese, cases are marked by placing particles after nouns. The accusative case is marked with を (wo, pronounced ).

Turkish 
In Turkish, cases are marked with suffixes. Accusative case is marked with suffixes -ı, -i, -u, -ü, depending on the vowel harmony. An example is Arabayı, the word araba is marked with the suffix with the buffer letter y added because in Turkish, two vowels next to each other is not allowed. (The exception is words loaned from other languages such as saat, şiir etc.)

Malayalam 
In Malayalam, the accusative inflection is achieved using the suffix എ /-e/. Example: രാമൻ /raman/ → രാമനെ /ramane/. The sandhi also play a role here depending on the ending of the noun. Example: മരം /maram/ → മരത്തെ /maratte/ where /tt/ replaces /m/ when /e/ is suffixed.

See also 
Morphosyntactic alignment
Nota accusativi

References

Further reading 
 
 

Grammatical cases